Vislava is a village and municipality in Stropkov District in the Prešov Region of north-eastern Slovakia.

History
In historical records the village was first mentioned in 1353.

Geography
The municipality lies at an altitude of 269 metres and covers an area of 10.961 km². It has a population of about 234 people.

References

External links
 
 

Villages and municipalities in Stropkov District
Šariš